Paju Stadium is a multi-use stadium in Paju, South Korea.  It is currently used mostly for football matches.  The stadium holds 22,000 people and opened in 2001.

External links
 World Stadiums
Cafe.daum.net/stade

References

Football venues in South Korea
Sports venues in Gyeonggi Province